Confine is a village (curazia) located in San Marino. It belongs to the municipality (castello) of Chiesanuova. Its name, in Italian, means "border".

Geography
The village is situated in the southern corner of the state, close to the borders with Italy and the municipalities of San Leo and Verucchio. It is one of the southernmost villages of San Marino.

Notes and references

See also
Chiesanuova
Caladino
Galavotto
Molarini
Poggio Casalino
Poggio Chiesanuova
Teglio

Curazie in San Marino
Italy–San Marino border crossings
Chiesanuova